The 1987 All Japan Touring Car Champion was the 3rd edition of the series. It began at Mine on 21 March and finished after six events at Suzuka on 4 December. The championship was won by Naoki Nagasaka, driving for Object T.

All Japan Touring Car Championship

Results

References

Japanese Touring Car Championship seasons
1987 World Touring Car Championship season